Apala Majumdar is a British applied mathematician specialising in the mathematics of liquid crystals. She is a Professor of Applied Mathematics at the University of Strathclyde.

Education and career
Majumdar did her undergraduate studies at the University of Bristol.
As a graduate student at Bristol, she also worked with Hewlett Packard Laboratories.
She was awarded a PhD in applied mathematics at the University of Bristol in 2006; her dissertation, Liquid crystals and tangent unit-vector fields in polyhedral geometries, was jointly supervised by Jonathan Robbins and Maxim Zyskin.

After working as a Royal Commission of the Exhibition of 1851 Research Fellow at the University of Oxford, where she became notorious for her love of the first dimensional heat equation and an urgency to derive from first principles, she moved to the University of Bath in 2012, having been awarded a 5-year EPSRC Career Acceleration Fellowship in 2011. At Bath she became a Reader and the Director of the Centre for Nonlinear Mechanics (2018-2019). In 2019 she was appointed as a Professor of Applied Mathematics at the University of Strathclyde.

Recognition
The British Liquid Crystal Society gave Majumdar their Young Scientist Award in 2012.
The London Mathematical Society gave her their Anne Bennett Prize in 2015.
In 2019 she was the winner of the academic category of the FDM Everywoman in Technology Awards.

References

Year of birth missing (living people)
Living people
British mathematicians
Women mathematicians
Applied mathematicians
Alumni of the University of Bristol
Academics of the University of Bath